Javadabad (also Romanized as Javādābād and Jawādābād) is a city in, capital of, Javadabad District of Varamin County, Tehran province, Iran. At the 2006 census, its population was 4,718 in 1,103 households. The following census in 2011 counted 4,903 people in 1,220 households. The latest census in 2016 showed a population of 4,844 people in 1,494 households.

References 

Varamin County

Cities in Tehran Province

Populated places in Tehran Province

Populated places in Varamin County